The diocese of Benepota is a suppressed and titular see of the Roman Catholic Church.

History
Benepota, in today's Algeria, is an ancient bishopric of the Roman province of Mauretania Caesariensis.
 The location of the see is not currently known, But what is known is that the Bishop of the town attended a meeting of bishops convened in Carthage in 484 by King Huneric the Vandal.

Today Benepota survives as a titular bishopric and the current bishop is Leopold Hermes Garin Bruzzone, of Canelones.

Known bishops
Honorius (fl.484 AD)
Francisco Rendeiro, (1965–1967) 
José Cerviño Cerviño (1968–1976) 
Tadeusz Rybak (1977–1992)
Leopoldo Hermes Garin Bruzzone, (2002–current)

References

Archaeological sites in Algeria
Catholic titular sees in Africa
Roman towns and cities in Mauretania Caesariensis
Ancient Berber cities